Chamaedorea is a genus of 107 species of palms, native to subtropical and tropical regions of the Americas. The leaves are pinnate (rarely entire), with one to numerous leaflets. The flowers are produced in inflorescences; they are dioecious, with male and female flowers on separate plants. The fruit is an orange or red drupe 0.5–2 cm diameter. Perhaps the best-known species is Chamaedorea elegans (neanthe bella palm or parlor palm) from Mexico and Guatemala. It is popular as a houseplant, particularly in Victorian houses. Another well-known species is Chamaedorea seifrizii, the bamboo palm or reed palm.

The name Chamaedorea comes , in reference to easily  reached fruits, or the plants' low-growing nature.

Species

Formerly placed here
Synechanthus fibrosus (H.Wendl.) H.Wendl. (as C. fibrosa H.Wendl.)

See also
 Xate

References

 
Arecaceae genera
Dioecious plants
Neotropical realm flora
Taxa named by Carl Ludwig Willdenow